The 1983 Tendring District Council election took place on 5 May 1983 to elect members of Tendring District Council in England. This was the same day as other local elections held across the United Kingdom.

Summary

Election result

|}

Ward results

Alesford, Thorrington & Frating

Ardleigh

Beaumont & Thorpe

Bockings Elm

Bradfield, Wrabness & Wix

Brightlingsea East

Brightlingsea West

Elmstead

Frinton

Golf Green

Great & Little Oakley

Great Bentley

Great Bromley, Little Bromley Etc.

Harwich East

Harwich East Central

Harwich West

Harwich West Central

Haven

Holland & Kirby

Lawford & Manningtree

Little Clacton

Mistley

Ramsey & Parkeston

Rush Green

Southcliff

St. Bartholomews

St. James

St. John's

St. Mary's

St. Osyth & Point Clear

Tendring & Weeley

Walton

References

Tendring District Council elections
1983 English local elections
1980s in Essex